Sé (German: Scheibing) is a village in Vas county, in the west of Hungary, located near the border with Austria.

Location 
Sé is located 5 km west of Szombathely, the banks of the river Arany.

Origins of name 
The word Sé is from Hungarian séd, "brook".

History 
A water pipe passed here in the Roman age. Parts of water pipe have been found in the village.
The population of the village was 415 in 1901.

Landmarks 
The old destroyed church was built in 1660, the new church was built in 1901.

External links 
 Street map 
 History of village 
 Official site of Sé 
 Portal of Sé

References 

Populated places in Vas County